Framsticks is a 3D freeware Artificial Life simulator.  Organisms consisting of physical structures ("bodies") and control structures ("brains") evolve over time against a user's predefined fitness landscape (for instance, evolving for speed), or spontaneously coevolve in a complex environment. Evolution of organisms occurs primarily through artificial selection, where an intelligent selector chooses the selection parameters and mutation rates. Also the organisms rate of crossing-over can be chosen thus reflecting the sharing of genes by mating in nature. The simulated organisms have genetic scripts inspired by DNA found in living organisms in nature. A user can isolate a particular organism in the gene pool and edit its genotype. Framsticks allows users to design organisms or manually edit the living genetic code of an organism. Users have the ability to seed the environment with energy orbs that the organisms convert to energy and material. Depending on how the organism does in its lifespan determines the future of the virtual gene pool. Gene pools can be exported and shared.

Bodies
The bodies are made up of various building blocks that are assembled according to a genetic script. Building blocks include: a rotator, hinge, muscle, structure, and receptor.

Brains
The brains are basic neural networks that show up as a network of firing neurons. The genetic script serves as the blueprints for the exact assembly and functioning of the neural network.

World
The world or ‘universe’ can be set to height-field editable as blocks and/or steep planes, ‘water’, flat, or a combination of all these and be edited by user as map in simple text-format. It has adjustable gravitation and water-level.

See also
Digital organism
Artificial life
List of other Alife Simulators

External links
 Framsticks home page
 Worlds and Organisms sample gallery
 Comparison of Different Encodings for Simulated 3D Agents

Artificial life
Artificial life models
Agent-based software